The 1896 Duquesne Country and Athletic Club football season was the second season of competition for the American football team representing the Duquesne Country and Athletic Club (DC&AC) of Pittsburgh, Pennsylvania. The team finished with a record of 6–3–1.

Season summary
The team suffered a heavy turnover in personnel from its previous season, with only five players returning. It spent much of its early season trying to settle on a stable lineup.

On November 10, the DC&AC became the first team ever to face a fully professional football team. The opponent was the Allegheny Athletic Association, whose players were each to be paid $100 per game. The Duquesnes lost the game 12–0 at Exposition Park. The "Three A's" would cease to exist after shutting out the Pittsburgh Athletic Club a day later.

Victories against the Pittsburgh Athletic Club and Greensburg gave the DC&AC a claim as the best of the "big four" Western Pennsylvania athletic clubs (which also included Latrobe). The DC&AC however could not match the success of the region's top collegiate team—the undefeated, unscored-upon Washington & Jefferson—to whom they lost 4–0 on Thanksgiving Day.

Schedule

References

Duquesne Country and Athletic Club
Duquesne Country and Athletic Club seasons
Duquesne Country and Athletic Club